The Gamache River is a watercourse flowing successively the municipality of Saint-Valérien and the Le Bic sector of the town of Rimouski, in the Rimouski-Neigette Regional County Municipality, in the administrative region of Bas-Saint-Laurent, in Quebec, Canada.

The Gamache River is a tributary on the east bank of the rivière du Bic, which flows northeast to the southeast coast of the Saint Lawrence River and flows into the city of Rimouski.

Geography 
The Gamache River takes its source from agricultural and forest streams in the fifth rang East, in Saint-Valérien, in the Notre Dame Mountains.

The Gamache River flows over  divided into the following segments:
  southwesterly, up to the fifth Rang Est road;
  to the southwest, crossing under the Gendreau road bridge, to the confluence of the outlet (coming from the northeast) of a small lake;
  towards the south-west, collecting water from several streams, up to the Central road;
  towards the south-west, up to the confluence of the outlet (coming from the south-west) of Lac de la Pelle;
  northward, up to the confluence of the Raphaël stream (coming from the northeast);
  north-west, collecting water from the Lafrenière watercourse (coming from the west), to the bridge on Chemin du fourth rang West (main Street);
  northeasterly, to the limit of Le Bic of the city of Rimouski;
  west, up to the "Montée Joseph-D'Astous" road;
  westward, up to its confluence.

The Gamache River flows into a bend in the river on the east bank of the Bic River in the Le Bic sector of the city of Rimouski.

Toponymy 
The term "Gamache" constitutes a family name of French origin.

The toponym "rivière Gamache" was formalized on December 5, 1968, at the Commission de toponymie du Québec.

References

See also 

 Estuary of Saint Lawrence
 Rivière du Bic, a stream
 Saint-Valérien, a municipality
 Le Bic, a sector of the city of Rimouski
 Rimouski, a city
 Rimouski-Neigette Regional County Municipality

Rivers of Bas-Saint-Laurent
Rimouski-Neigette Regional County Municipality